The Pearl of Africa Music Awards (also known as the PAM Awards) was an annual national music award event held in Uganda. The inaugural event was held in 2003. In 2006, categories for musicians from other East African countries were introduced.

Winners were selected by a combination of a panel of judges and a public vote.

References

External links
Pearl of Africa Music Awards
2004 Winners
2005 Winners & Nominees
2006 winners (Nominees)
2007 winners (Nominees)
2008 winners (Nominees)

African music awards
Ugandan music